Shalka (also Romanized as Shālkā) is a village in Tulem Rural District, Tulem District, Sowme'eh Sara County, Gilan Province, Iran. At the 2006 census, its population was 30, in 5 families.

References 

Populated places in Sowme'eh Sara County